Mzimba is a town in the Mzimba District of Malawi. The district is inhabited by descendants of Tumbuka and few Ngoni people.

The district of Mzimba has a number of Traditional Authorities from the Ngoni people. The head of these Traditional Authorities, or Paramount Chief (Inkosi), is M'Mbelwa V.

Formerly an administrative centre, the town has declined in importance since 1940. The surrounding region includes the Mzimba Plain, the northern extension of the Central Region Plateau, Mount Hora (5,742 feet [1,750 metres]), and the Viphya Mountains. Poor soils support subsistence agriculture, as well as a Turkish-tobacco cash crop. Pop. (2008) 20,756.

Climate

Demographics

Mzimba Population by Tribe

Mzimba Population by Religion

Notable residents
Goodall Edward Gondwe Former Minister of Finance and a Politician.
Mwayi Kumwenda Malawi star and international Netball player.

References

Populated places in Northern Region, Malawi